Barbados competed in the Summer Olympic Games for the first time at the 1968 Summer Olympics in Mexico City, Mexico. Nine competitors, all men, took part in ten events in five sports.

Athletics

Ezra Burnham   
Hadley Hinds

Cycling

Four cyclists represented Barbados in 1968.

Individual road race
 Colin Forde   
 Kensley Reece   
 Richard Roett   
 Michael Stoute

Sprint
 Kensley Reece

1000m time trial
 Kensley Reece

Individual pursuit
 Colin Forde

Shooting

One shooter represented Barbados in 1968.

50 m rifle, prone
Milton Tucker

Swimming

Angus Edghill

Weightlifting

Anthony Phillips

References

External links
Official Olympic Reports

Nations at the 1968 Summer Olympics
1968
Olympics